Rufus Henry Pope (September 13, 1857 – May 16, 1944) was a Canadian politician.

Born in Cookshire, Canada East, the son of John Henry Pope, Pope was educated at the Cookshire Academy, Sherbrooke High School and McGill College Law School. He was a farmer and breeder of thoroughbred cattle. He was first elected to the House of Commons of Canada for the electoral district of Compton in an 1889 by-election called to fill the vacancy caused by the death of his father. A Conservative, he was re-elected in 1891, 1896, and 1900. He was defeated in 1904, in a 1906 by-election, and in 1908. He was called to the Senate of Canada representing the senatorial division of Bedford, Quebec on the advice of Robert Borden in 1911. He served until his death in 1944 at his home in Cookshire.

Electoral record 
By-election: On Mr. Pope's death, 1 April 1889

By-election: On election being declared void, Nov. 22, 1905

References

 
 

1857 births
1944 deaths
Canadian senators from Quebec
Conservative Party of Canada (1867–1942) MPs
Conservative Party of Canada (1867–1942) senators
Members of the House of Commons of Canada from Quebec
McGill University Faculty of Law alumni
Anglophone Quebec people
People from Estrie